Gisella is an Italian variant of the feminine given name Gisela. Notable people with the name are as follows:

Gisella Anastasia (born 1990), Indonesian actress
Gisella Caccialanza (1914–1998), American prima ballerina 
Gisella Delle Grazie (1868–1894–95), Italian composer
Gisella Floreanini (1906–1993), Italian politician 
Gisella Giovenco (born 1946), Italian painter
Gisella Grosz (1875–1942), Hungarian classical pianist
Gisella Loeffler (1902–1977), Austro-Hungarian–American painter
Gisella Marengo (born 1975), Italian actress and producer
Gisella Orsini (born 1971), Swiss writer and racewalker
Gisella Perl (1907–1988), Hungarian Jewish gynecologist and author
Gisella Sofio (1931–2017), Italian actress

Italian feminine given names